The Primrose Ring is a novel by Ruth Sawyer, published first in 1915 and illustrated by Fanny Munsell. This was Sawyer's first published novel. She later wrote the 1937 Newbery Medal winner Roller Skates.

Film adaptation
The novel was adapted into a silent film by Paramount Pictures in 1917. The film version starring Mae Murray and an uncredited Loretta Young (in her film debut as a Fairy), and was directed by Robert Z. Leonard.

References

External links

Film description
 

1915 American novels
American novels adapted into films